Marcus Porcius Cato Licinianus (191–152 BC) was son of  Cato the Censor by his first wife Licinia, and thence called Licinianus, to distinguish him from his half-brother, Marcus Porcius Cato Salonianus, the son of Salonia. He was distinguished as a jurist.

Biography

Early life and education
His father paid great attention to his education, physical as well as mental, and studied to preserve his young mind from every immoral taint. He was taught to ride, to swim, to wrestle, to fence, and, perhaps to the injury of a weak constitution, was exposed to vicissitudes of cold and heat in order to harden his frame. His father would not allow his learned slave Chilo to superintend the education of his son, lest the boy should acquire slavish notions or habits, but wrote lessons of history for him in large letters with his own hand, and afterwards composed a kind of Encyclopaedia for his use. Under such tuition, the young Cato became a wise and virtuous man.

Life as a soldier
He first entered life as a soldier, and served, 173 BC, in Liguria under the consul Marcus Popilius Laenas. The legion to which he belonged having been disbanded, he took the military oath a second time, by the advice of his father, in order to qualify himself legally to fight against the enemy. In 168 BC, he fought against Perseus of Macedon at the Battle of Pydna under the consul Lucius Aemilius Paullus Macedonicus, whose daughter, Aemilia Tertia, he afterwards married. He distinguished himself in the battle by his personal prowess in a combat in which he first lost and finally recovered his sword. The details of this combat are related with variations by several authors. He returned to the troops on his own side covered with wounds, and was received with applause by the consul, who gave him his discharge in order that he might get cured. Here again his father seems to have cautioned him to take no further part in battle, as after his discharge he was no longer a soldier.

Life as a jurist
Henceforward he appears to have devoted himself to the practice of the law, in which he attained considerable eminence. In the obscure and corrupt fragment of Sextus Pomponius' de Origine Juris, after mentioning Sextus and Publius Aelius and Publius Atilius, the author proceeds to speak of the two Catos. This passage seems to speak of a Cato before the Censor, but Pomponius wrote in paragraphs, devoting one to each succession of jurists, and the word Deinde commences that of the Catos, though the Censor had been mentioned by anticipation at the end of the preceding paragraph. From the Catos, father and son, the subsequent jurists traced their succession. Apollinaris Sulpicius, in that passage of Aulus Gellius which is the principal authority with respect to the genealogy of the Cato family, speaks of the son as having written “egregios de juris disciplina libros”. Festus (under Mundus) cites the commentarii juris civilis of Cato, probably the son, and Julius Paullus cites Cato's 15th book. Cicero censures Cato and Brutus for introducing in their published responsa the names of the persons who consulted them. Celsus cites an opinion of Cato concerning the intercalary month, and the regula or sententia Catoniana is frequently mentioned in the Digest. The regula Catoniana was a celebrated rule of Roman law to the effect, that a legacy should never be valid unless it would have been valid if the testator had died immediately after he had made his will. This rule (which had several exceptions) was a particular case of a more general maxim: “Quod initio non valet, id tractu temporis non potest convalescere”. The greater celebrity of the son as a jurist, and the language of the citations from Cato, render it likely that the son is the Cato of the Digest. From the manner in which Cato is mentioned in the Institutes,—“Apud Catonem bene scriptum refert antiquitas,”—it may be inferred, that he was known only at second hand in the time of Justinian.

He died when praetor designatus, about 152 BC, a few years before his father, who bore his loss with resignation, and, on the ground of poverty, gave him a frugal funeral.

His elder son was the consul of 118 BC, Marcus Porcius Cato.

Family

Notes

References
Gregori Maians i Císcar (Gregorius Majansius), ad XXX Iurisconsultus (Comments on thirty jurists), i. I—113.
E. L. Harnier, de Regula Catoniana, Heidelb. 1820.
Wilhelm Drumann, Geschichte Roms (History of Rome), v. p. 149, 6 Bde. Königsberg 1834–1844.
 Graham Vincent Sumner, The Orators in Cicero's Brutus: Prosopography and Chronology, (Phoenix Supplementary Volume XI.), Toronto and Buffalo, University of Toronto Press, 1973.
This entry incorporates public domain text originally from:
William Smith (ed.), A New Classical Dictionary of Greek and Roman Biography, Mythology and Geography, 1851.
William Smith (ed.), Dictionary of Greek and Roman Biography and Mythology, 1870.

190s BC births
152 BC deaths
2nd-century BC Romans
Ancient Roman jurists
Ancient Roman soldiers
Cato Licinianus, Marcus
Senators of the Roman Republic